Icius minimus is a jumping spider species in the genus Icius that lives in Ethiopia.

References

Endemic fauna of Ethiopia
Salticidae
Spiders of Africa
Spiders described in 2008
Taxa named by Wanda Wesołowska